"If the Fall Don't Get You" is a song written by Van Stephenson, Dave Robbins and Sam Lorber, and recorded by American country music artist Janie Fricke.  It was released in May 1984 as the third single from the album Love Lies.  The song reached #8 on the Billboard Hot Country Singles & Tracks chart, breaking a string of eight consecutive top 5 country hits for Fricke, the last three of which had all hit #1 on Billboard's country charts.

Chart performance

References

1984 singles
Janie Fricke songs
Songs written by Van Stephenson
Song recordings produced by Bob Montgomery (songwriter)
Columbia Records singles
Songs written by Dave Robbins (keyboardist)
Songs written by Sam Lorber
1984 songs